Dallas Clayton Goedert (born January 3, 1995) is an American football tight end for the Philadelphia Eagles of the National Football League (NFL). He played college football at South Dakota State, and was drafted by the Eagles in the second round of the 2018 NFL Draft.

Early years
Goedert attended Britton-Hecla High School in Britton, South Dakota. He played football, soccer, and basketball for the Braves athletic teams in high school.   His father, a huge Dallas Cowboys fan, named him after the team.

College career
Goedert joined South Dakota State University as a walk-on and was with the Jackrabbits from 2013 (he was redshirted as a freshman) to 2017. During his career, he had 198 receptions for 2,988 yards and 21 touchdowns, including two straight 1,000-yard receiving seasons. He started all 14 games in his senior season and was a team captain, totaling 72 catches for 1,111 yards receiving and seven touchdowns. Goedert's collegiate career at South Dakota State saw him as a two-time first-team FCS All-American and he was a finalist in 2016 for the Walter Payton Award, which recognizes the top player in the FCS. At the conclusion of the 2017 season, Goedert accepted an invitation to play in the 2018 Senior Bowl. However, he was injured during practice and withdrew from the game.

Professional career

The Philadelphia Eagles selected Goedert in the second round (49th overall) of the 2018 NFL Draft. The Eagles traded their second (52nd overall) and fifth round picks (169th overall) to the Indianapolis Colts in order to move up in the second round, ahead of the Dallas Cowboys (50th overall), to draft Goedert. It was speculated by draft analysts that the Dallas Cowboys were going to possibly draft Goedert as they were in need of a tight end following the retirement of veterans Jason Witten and James Hanna. Goedert was the third tight end drafted in 2018 and was selected as a replacement for Brent Celek whom the Eagles released on March 13, 2018.

2018

On May 9, 2018, the Philadelphia Eagles signed Goedert to a four-year, $5.62 million contract that includes $2.90 guaranteed and a signing bonus of $2.17 million. Goedert made his NFL debut in the 2018 season opener against the Atlanta Falcons. In the 18–12 victory, he had a single reception for four yards. He scored his first career touchdown, a 13-yard reception from Carson Wentz, on September 23, 2018, against the Indianapolis Colts. The touchdown as part of a seven-reception, 73-yard performance for Goedert. He scored a receiving touchdown in both Week 7 against the Carolina Panthers and Week 8 against the Jacksonville Jaguars. Overall, Goedert finished his rookie season with 33 receptions for 334 receiving yards and four receiving touchdowns. In the Wild Card Round of the playoffs, in a 16–15 victory over the Chicago Bears, Goedert caught a 10-yard pass in the end zone from Eagles quarterback Nick Foles. The touchdown gave the Eagles a 10-6 lead, on their way to an upset 16-15 win in Chicago. Goedert also made a good play in catching a low pass, breaking a tackle, and running for a first down on another ten yard reception, during the Eagles' winning touchdown drive.

2019

In Week 16 of the 2019 season, Goedert recorded a career high nine receptions for a career-high 91 yards and one touchdown in a 17–9 victory over the Dallas Cowboys while also being nominated for PFF NFL Week 16 Team of the Week. In a must-win week 17 game against the New York Giants, Goedert contributed to an Eagles victory after recording four receptions for 65 yards during the 34-17 victory which clinched the NFC East title for the second time within three seasons. Goedert finished the regular season with 58 receptions for five touchdowns and 607 yards. In the Wild Card Round against the Seattle Seahawks, Goedert recorded seven receptions for 76 yards during a 17-9 loss.

2020
Goedert was assaulted in a South Dakota bar on June 22, 2020, and briefly received treatment at a hospital.

In the Eagles' 2020 season-opening loss to the Washington Football Team, Goedert had eight receptions for 101 receiving yards and one receiving touchdown. In Week 3, he suffered an ankle injury and was placed on injured reserve on September 29, 2020. He was activated on October 31, 2020. In the 2020 season, Goedert had 46 receptions for 524 receiving yards and three receiving touchdowns.

2021
Goedert took over as the Eagles TE1 following the trade of Zach Ertz in October. On November 19, 2021, Goedert signed a four-year extension with the Philadelphia Eagles. He was placed on the COVID list on January 3, 2022. In Week 13, he had six receptions for 105 receiving yards and two receiving touchdowns in the 33–18 victory over the New York Jets. In Week 15, he had seven receptions for 135 receiving yards in the 27–17 victory over the Washington Football Team. Goedert finished the 2021 season with 56 receptions for 830 receiving yards and four receiving touchdowns. He was activated one week later on January 10, missing just one game where the Eagles did not play their starters.

2022
Goedert was placed on IR on November 16, 2022, after suffering a shoulder injury as a result of a facemask penalty that went uncalled. He was activated on December 20. He finished the 2022 season with 55 receptions for 702 receiving yards and three receiving touchdowns in 12 games.

Goedert scored a receiving touchdown in the Divisional Round victory over the New York Giants. Goedert reached Super Bowl LVII where he had six catches for 60 yards but lost 38-35 to the Kansas City Chiefs.

NFL career statistics

Regular season

Playoffs

References

External links

Philadelphia Eagles bio
South Dakota State Jackrabbits bio

1995 births
Living people
Players of American football from South Dakota
People from Britton, South Dakota
American football tight ends
South Dakota State Jackrabbits football players
Philadelphia Eagles players